Jubilee Bridge may refer to:

Australia
 Jubilee Bridge, pre-completion name of the Story Bridge in Brisbane
 Jubilee Bridge (Innisfail), connecting Innisfail and East Innisfail, Queensland
 Jubilee Bridge, Southport, connecting Southport with Main Beach on the Gold Coast, Queensland

India
 Jubilee Bridge (India), in West Bengal
 Silver Jubilee Railway Bridge Bharuch, over the river Narmada

England
 Golden Jubilee Bridges, a pair of pedestrian bridges in London
 Jubilee Bridge, official name of the Walney Bridge, in Barrow-in-Furness, Cumbria
 Silver Jubilee Bridge, in Halton
 Tees Jubilee Bridge, in Stockton-on-Tees

Elsewhere
 Jubilee Bridge (Queensferry), in Wales
 Jubilee Bridge, Singapore, a pedestrian bridge in Singapore
 Jubilee Bridge of the Emperor Franz Josef I, original name of the Dragon Bridge (Ljubljana) in Slovenia
 Victoria Jubilee Bridge, prior name of the Victoria Bridge (Montreal) in Canada

See also